Germanium tetrabromide is an inorganic compound with the formula GeBr4. It can be formed by reacting solid germanium and gaseous bromine.
Ge + 2Br2 -> GeBr4

From this reaction, GeBr4 has a heat of formation of 83.3 kcal/mol.

The compound is liquid at 25 °C, and forms an interlocking liquid structure. From room temperature down to −60 °C the structure takes on a cubic α form, whereas at lower temperatures it takes on a monoclinic β form.

References

Germanium(IV) compounds
Bromides